Soluna Samay Kettel (born 27 August 1990, Guatemala City, Guatemala) is a Guatemalan-Danish singer of Swiss and German origin based in Denmark. Samay represented Denmark in the Eurovision Song Contest 2012 in Baku, Azerbaijan with her entry "Should've Known Better."

Early life
Soluna Samay Kettel was born in Guatemala City, Guatemala to a German father, musician Gerd G. Kettel  (stage name Gee Gee Kettel) and a Swiss mother, artist Annelis Ziegler. She grew up on the shores of Lago de Atitlán, Guatemala and attended the Robert Muller LIFE school. Soluna moved to Denmark in 2000 when her parents purchased a small farm on Bornholm, a Danish island in the Baltic Sea. Soluna is multilingual speaking fluent English, Danish, Spanish and German. Her name is derived from the Spanish words sol and luna, meaning Sun and Moon. Soluna has a Swiss passport, so, officially she is Swiss.

Music career
Soluna's music career began at age of 5 when she joined her father on drums and soon after began singing along. At the age of 10 she switched to electric bass, at 16 to upright bass. With her parents she spent her summers touring and playing music on the streets of Europe, and  winters living in Guatemala. Soluna started to learn guitar around the age of 12, when she also wrote her first songs.

National final and Eurovision 2012 

Soluna was chosen as a wildcard entry by DR1 for the Dansk Melodi Grand Prix (Danish Eurovision Song Contest), singing a song called "Should've Known Better" written by Remee, Isam B (Outlandish) and A Sulaiman and produced by Chief1. She won the Dansk Melodi Grand Prix 2012 on 21 January over Jesper Nohrstedt and Christian Brøns & Patrik Isaksson, and won the right to represent Denmark at the Eurovision Song Contest 2012.

 Results from the voting of the Dansk Melodi Grand Prix 2012

The song performed 13th in the first semi-final and finished 9th to qualify for the Eurovision final where she finished 23rd.

Debut album
Soluna recorded her debut album "Sing Out Loud" over a two-year period, produced by Jesper Mejlvang and Michael Friis. It was released by Baltic Records on 23 September 2011.

Discography

Gee Gee & Soluna
The Beat Goes On (Ozella Music; 2001)
Thinking Of You (Ozella Music; 2004)
Movin’ On (Chocolate Factory; 2006)
Lucky Seven (Funky Farm Records; 2007)
Just Passing Through (Chocolate Factory; 2008)
Streetwise (Funky Farm; 2009)
The Best & the Rest (Chocolate Factory; 2011)

Soluna Samay

Albums

Singles

References

External links
 
 

1990 births
Living people
Danish child singers
Danish women singer-songwriters
Guatemalan emigrants to Denmark
Guatemalan people of Swiss descent
Guatemalan people of German descent
Eurovision Song Contest entrants for Denmark
Eurovision Song Contest entrants of 2012
People from Guatemala City
English-language singers from Denmark
Spanish-language singers of Denmark
21st-century Danish women singers